Pukaqucha (Quechua puka red, qucha lake, "red lake", hispanicized spelling Pucacocha) is a mountain in the Andes of Peru, about  high. It is located in the Cusco Region, Calca Province, Calca District, east of the Urupampa mountain range and northwest of Suntur, The mountain is surrounded by some smaller lakes including Pampaqucha, Mankhaqucha, Q'umirqucha, Suntuqucha and Llulluchayuq.

References 

Mountains of Peru
Mountains of Cusco Region